Kim Mahood (born 1953) is an Australian writer and artist based in Wamboin, New South Wales.

Mahood grew up on Mongrel Downs in the Northern Territory of Australia, then known as Tanami Downs Station. Her early life there features heavily in her work, including in her two-part biography Craft for a Dry Lake (2000) and Position Doubtful: mapping landscapes and memories (2016).

Biography 

Mahood was born in 1953 to parents, Alexander (always known as Joe) and Marie Mahood, who had worked across the Northern Territory on various cattle stations and, when Mahood was born, her father was employed by the Department of Native Affairs on the newly established Hooker Creek Native Settlement (now known as Lajamanu) until they relocated due to Mahood's health deteriorating and they were relocated to Beswick in Arnhem Land.

However, due to a number of frustrations of the bureaucracy of working for the Department of Native Affairs, Mahood's father soon left to work for Colonel Rose in the animal industry branch (AIB) and this job meant that the family travelled throughout the Northern Territory on a regular basis and the family spent four years living in Finke as a part of her father's role.

When the family left Finke, now with four children, the family relocated to Alice Springs before where her father pursued work as a cartoonist and her mother taught French at the local high school.

The Mahood family took up the lease on Mongrel Downs Station in 1962 alongside Bill Wilson. There are many stories and disagreements about where this name came from with many Warlipiri people believing it is a distortion of the Warlpiri name for Lake Ruth, Monkarrurpa, while a former NT Administrator believed it was a personal dig at him. However, Mahood believes that it is in response to the popular perception that it was a "mongrel bit of country" and that they were crazy to try to establish a station there.

In 1971 the partnership between Joe Mahood and Bill Wilson dissolved and the Mahood family moved to Central Queensland, where they established Cattle Camp Station. Joe was killed helicopter mustering in 1990 and this sad event prompted Mahood to make her first trip back to Mongrel Downs in 1992.

Mahood's first biography, "Craft for a dry lake" (2000), which won the NSW Premier's Award for non-fiction and was named The Age Book of the Year for non-fiction, is the result of this journey and she says:

Mahood won the 2013 Peter Blazey Fellowship for manuscript development.

Mahood's second biography, "Position Doubtful: mapping landscapes and memories" (2016) tracks her itinerant life and work since her first and remains focused on Central Australia and exploring her "unusual position at the interface of cultures". This book was shortlisted for the 2017 Victorian Premier's Award for non-fiction, the Queensland Literary Awards, the ACT Book of the Year and the National Biography Award.

Mahood is a regular contributor to the Griffith Review and The Monthly.

She still spends several months each year in the Tanami and Great Sandy Desert regions where she grew up.

Bibliography

Books 
 Craft for a Dry Lake (2000) 
 Position Doubtful: mapping landscapes and memories (2016)
 Wandering With Intent (2022)

Book reviews

References 

1953 births
Living people
Australian Book Review people
Australian women writers
Australian writers
People from Alice Springs